Greg Ketterman is a United States multihull sailboat designer.

Designs
Hobie Adventure Island

See also
Trimaran
Polyreme

References

Multihull designers
American yacht designers
Year of birth missing (living people)
Living people